The Lebanese nobility is a social class that was formed during the Ottoman Lebanon period.

History 
Noble Lebanese families hold titles that were granted to them by the Ottoman authorities or by the Emir of Mount Lebanon.

Not all descendants of Lebanese noble families were able to retain their honorific titles. The survival of these titles within certain branches of the old noble families depended on their political connections, wealth & relative clout within their respective communities. Many families, who were originally of high noble stock, have lost their social stature over time (to a lower rank, or were stripped from all titles of nobility).

Others have moved the opposite way, from lower titles of nobility to higher stature, normally with the Ottoman central government or its representatives bestowing upon them honorific titles for services rendered, or upon appointment to official post.

Ottoman titles and ranks 
Ottoman honorific titles were mostly based on their earlier usage in the military-administrative history. With time, these same titles started to be given to the civilian high ranking officials. Many of these terms were Persian in origin. Unlike Arabic honorific titles, an Ottoman title comes directly after the first name (instead of preceding it).

During the time of the Mutasarrifate of Mount Lebanon, only the Mutasarrıf (i.e. governor) was granted the honorific title of Pasha, other high ranking officials were given the title of Bey. The lower ranking officials held the title of Agha.

List of titles 
 Pasha
 Bey
 Agha
 Effendi
 Kaymakam
 Sheikh
 Emir
 Muqaddam

Lebanese nobility today 
In modern Lebanon, many families still retain the honorific noble titles of Sheikh, Muqaddam, Emir & Bey. The Lebanese government formally recognizes their rights by including the honorific titles in the official Lebanese ID documents (with title preceding the first name; except for the Turkish Bey title which follows the first name). Using nobility is disallowed during indirect elections in parliament.

References

 
Estates (social groups)
Feudalism
Oligarchy
Social classes